Clarance is both a given name and a surname.

Notable people with the given name include:
Clarance Holt (1826–1903), English actor-manager

Notable people with the surname include:
Elijah Clarance (born 1998), Swedish basketball player

See also 

 Clarence (disambiguation)